Michael Cooney (born 1943, Carmel, California, United States) is an American folk and blues musician who performed in the 1960s folk revival. He is known for his blues performances as well as for performing at, and organizing, many folk festivals.  In 1963, he participated in a "Young Folksinger's Contest" at the Monterey Folk Festival; Barbara Dane was the contest judge and another contest participant was Janis Joplin.

Cooney was the featured musical guest on a first-season episode of Sesame Street (episode 33, originally aired December 24, 1969).

Cooney served on the boards of the Newport Folk Festival and also the National Folk Festival.  His albums include The Cheese Stands Alone, Singer of Old Songs, Still Cooney After All These Years, Pure Unsweetened, and Together Again.

References

External links
 Official Website 
 Michael Cooney biography at allmusic.com
 Washington Post review of Pure Unsweetened

1943 births
Living people
American blues singers
American blues guitarists
American folk singers
American folk guitarists
American male guitarists
People from Carmel-by-the-Sea, California
20th-century American guitarists
20th-century American male musicians